Altitude diving is underwater diving using scuba or surface supplied diving equipment where the surface is  or more above sea level (for example, a mountain lake). Altitude is significant in diving because it affects the decompression requirement for a dive, so that the stop depths and decompression times used for dives at altitude are different from those used for the same dive profile at sea level. Most recently manufactured decompression computers can automatically compensate for altitude.

Measurement of depth at altitude 
Special consideration must be given to measurement of depth given the effect of pressure on gauges.
The use of bourdon tube, diaphragm, and digital depth gauges may require adjustment for use at altitude. Capillary gauges have been shown to be a conservative method for measurement of compensated depth at altitude. Modern dive computers detect changes in altitude or accept it as a user input and automatically adjust their calculation of a safe decompression regime for a dive at that altitude. If an altitude-aware computer is not used, altitude decompression tables must be used.

Decompression when diving at altitude 
At altitude, atmospheric pressure is lower than at sea level, so surfacing at the end of an altitude dive leads to a greater relative reduction in pressure and an increased risk of decompression sickness compared to the same dive profile at sea level. The dives are also typically carried out in freshwater at altitude so it has a lower density than seawater used for calculation of decompression tables. The amount of time the diver has spent acclimatising at altitude is also of concern as divers with gas loadings near those of sea level may also be at an increased risk. The US Navy recommends waiting 12 hours following arrival at altitude before performing the first dive. The tissue supersaturation following an ascent to altitude can also be accounted for by considering it to be residual nitrogen and allocating a residual nitrogen group when using tables with this facility.

Decompression tables 
The most common of the modifications to decompression tables at altitude are the "Cross Corrections" which use a ratio of atmospheric pressure and sea level to that of the altitude to provide a conservative equivalent sea level depth. The Cross Corrections were later looked at by Bassett and by Bell and Borgwardt.

Hennessy formulated that it was possible to convert standard air decompression tables for no-stop diving at altitude or from a habitat based on phase equilibration theory.

Albert A. Bühlmann recognized the problem and proposed a method which calculated maximum nitrogen loading in the tissues at a particular ambient pressure.

Wienke proposed guidelines for decompression diving at altitude in 1993.

Egi and Brubakk reviewed various models for preparing tables for diving at altitude.

Paulev and Zubieta have created a new conversion factor in order to make any sea-level dive table usable during high altitude diving in 2007.

Repetitive diving 
Repetitive dives should be conducted in the same manner as other dives including "Cross Corrections" for altitude. The US Navy does not allow repetitive diving for surface-supplied helium-oxygen diving and a 12-hour surface interval is required. An 18-hour surface interval is required if the dive requires decompression.

Pre- and post-dive ascents 
In addition to making depth adjustments using the Cross Conversions, dives at altitude often require pre- and post-dive altitude ascents which must be taken into consideration.  Several methods for performing post-dive ascents are used.  One is to adjust the dive times needed for an altitude ascent.  Another is to use surface intervals to allow for an ascent.

Extreme altitude diving 

This record was equaled by a team led by Nathalie Cabrol (SETI Institute/NASA Ames) in 2006. That year, Cabrol set the highest recorded altitude scuba diving for women. She also free dived at Lake Licancabur in 2003 and 2004.

This record stood for nine years before it was surpassed in 2016.

The current record for the highest scuba dive was set on December 13, 2019 by Polish diver and mountaineer Marcel Korkus. He dived at an altitude of 6,395 m above sea level (20,981 ft), on Ojos del Salado volcano setting an absolute world record in altitude diving. He is the first person to dive at such a high altitude. The dive took place in the so-called basin (a natural water reservoir, which in terms of dimensions cannot be considered a lake). The ice was 1.3 meters thick and the water temperature was 3 °C. It is probable that a human cannot dive at any higher altitude.

On 7 March 2016 Marcel Korkus discovered the highest lake on Earth (Cazadero at 5985 m above sea level) and thereby set the Guinness record in diving, confirmed by an official Guinness certificate. Shortly afterwards, as a result of the Guinness organization’s change of regulations to being less restrictive, the record was awarded to a Hungarian diver and mountaineer Erno Tósoki dived a maximum of 2 meters (6.6 ft) deep, for about 10 minutes on altitude 6,382 meters (20,938 ft). His record breaking dive was supported by only one support team member.

The highest scuba dive in the continental United States was done on 7 September 2013 by John Bali at Colorado's Pacific Tarn Lake, altitude .

The deepest known staged decompression altitude dive was conducted by Nuno Gomes at Boesmansgat (Bushman's hole) in South Africa. Gomes's decompression schedule was calculated as being equivalent to a dive to  if it had been conducted at sea level.

Jacques Cousteau's 1968 Lake Titicaca expedition 

In 1968 Jacques Cousteau mounted an expedition to explore Bolivia and Peru's Lake Titicaca in search of submerged Inca treasure.

The diving equipment was tested and practice dives were made off the coast of Peru, but poor weather interrupted the practice session.

The team visited ruins in Peru before continuing south to Copacabana, Bolivia, where a parade was held in honor of the event. Ruins were visited at Isla del Sol and Isla de la Luna, Then dives were made in the area to minor underwater ruins. The expected rich schools of fish were not found. For the next four weeks, dives were made in the area, during which many dead fish were found and collected. Large toads were also found and collected. Samples of the dead fish and the toads were sent to The Oceanographic Museum (Musée océanographique) in Monaco for study.

To help map the bottom of the lake Dr Harold Edgerton arrived from MIT with depth mapping equipment.

After mapping the lake an area was selected for the subs to dive. Floats were added to the subs to compensate for the lower density of fresh water, and the subs were launched. Jacques Cousteau and Albert Falco piloted the subs, which were accompanied by divers to a depth of 100 feet, then continued to a depth of 400 feet, where more toads were observed.

After the sub dive the results for the test on the dead fish arrived from Monaco. When trout were introduced into the lake in 1940 parasites were introduced with them.

Notes

References

External links
 Altitude Diving: Understanding the Tables – Todd Stedl, PhD and PADI Instructor
 Altitude Exposure after Diving – Edmond Kay, MD
 Diving At Altitude – John Ware, PhD
 At-Altitude Arithmetic – Larry "Harris" Taylor, PhD
 Altitude Diving Calculator – Online calculator to determine the theoretical ocean depth while scuba diving at altitude.

Diving decompression